Sevastopol was a  of the Soviet Navy.

Construction and career
The ship was built at A.A. Zhdanov in Leningrad and was launched on 30 September 1976 and commissioned on 26 September 1977.

She was decommissioned on 15 December 1989 and sold for scrap.

Pennant numbers

See also 
Cruiser
Kresta I-class cruiser
List of ships of the Soviet Navy
List of ships of Russia by project number

References

Ships built by Sevmash
Sverdlov-class cruisers
Ships of the Soviet Navy
1969 ships
Cold War cruisers of the Soviet Union